This page lists notable students, alumni, and faculty members of Central Washington University.

Sports

Football
 Adam Bighill — CFL Linebacker of the BC Lions
 Keith Gilbertson — NCAA football coach formerly of the University of Idaho, University of California, Berkeley, University of Washington. Played football for the Wildcats for one season in 1967, later graduating in 1971

Jon Kitna — NFL quarterback of the Seattle Seahawks, Cincinnati Bengals, Detroit Lions, and Dallas Cowboys. Led the team to an NAIA Div. II championship in 1995
 Greg Olson — NFL offensive coach, as of February of 2022 for the Los Angeles Rams
 Mike Reilly — CFL quarterback of the Edmonton Eskimos, Formerly of the Pittsburgh Steelers, Green Bay Packers, St. Louis Rams, Seattle Seahawks

Baseball
 MLB pitcher Dave Heaverlo — San Francisco Giants, Oakland Athletics, Seattle Mariners
 MLB outfielder Billy North — Chicago Cubs, Oakland Athletics, Los Angeles Dodgers, San Francisco Giants

Basketball
 Joe Callero — Head men's basketball coach at California Polytechnic State University and former head coach of Seattle University

Other
 Miesha "Cupcake" Tate — former Strikeforce Women's Bantamweight Champion, former Ultimate Fighting Championship Bantamweight Champion
 Bryan Caraway — UFC bantamweight fighter, x-boyfriend of Miesha Tate
 Matt Hume (business) — retired mixed martial artist; founder and head trainer at AMC Pankration in Seattle, V.P. of Operations at ONE Championship
 Anthony Hamilton — professional MMA fighter in the UFC's Heavyweight Division'

Government or military
 Ann Anderson (politician) — member of the Washington State Senate
 Staff Sergeant Bryan Christopher Black — US Army Special Forces soldier killed in action during the Tongo Tongo ambush in Niger on October 4, 2017.
U.S. Air National Guard Brigadier General John R. Croft — Chief of Staff of the Wisconsin Air National Guard
Duane Davidson — Washington State Treasurer
 U.S. Air National Guard Brigadier General Myron N. Dobashi — Commander of the Hawaii Air National Guard
USMC General James N. Mattis — United States Marine Corps. Class of 1972. Commander of the United States Central Command 2010–2013. Secretary of Defense under President Donald Trump.
 Astronaut Dorothy M. Metcalf-Lindenburger — assigned to the crew of STS-131, her first expedition.
 United States Coast Guard Signalman First Class Douglas Albert Munro (October 11, 1919 – September 27, 1942) — only member of the United States Coast Guard to have received the Medal of Honor, the U.S. military's highest decoration.
Lieutenant Commander Craig Olson, Navy Blue Angels — Demonstration #5 Lead Solo Pilot. A Boeing F/A-18E/F Super Hornet instructor pilot at Naval Air Station Lemoore. Decorations include:  Navy and Marine Corps Commendation Medal, three Navy and Marine Corps Achievement Medals, and various personal and unit awards.
Ron Sims — Former Deputy Secretary of the United States Department of Housing and Urban Development (under President Barack Obama) and former King County Executive.
Doug Sutherland — former Washington State Commissioner of Public Lands

Business
 Christine M. Day — CEO of athletic sportswear company Lululemon Athletica
 Stephen L. Nelson — author of "Quicken for Dummies" and 150 other books in the series, over 5 million copies sold worldwide. Named "most prolific computer book writer" by Wall Street Journal Shelley Powers — computer book author and technology architect
 Raymond Conner —  former vice chairman of The Boeing Company and president and CEO of Boeing Commercial Airplanes

Other
Ry Armstrong, musician and actor
Mary Jo Estep (1910-1992), teacher, sole survivor of the Battle of Kelley Creek
James L. Gaudino — president of Central Washington University from 2009 to 2021
W. Hudson Kensel — historian of the American West.
David L Boushey — American stuntman and the founder of the United Stuntmen's Association, the International Stunt School, the Society of American Fight Directors, and is a member of The Hollywood Stuntmen's Hall Of Fame.
Quigg Lawrence — Anglican bishop
Daniel D. McCracken — prominent computer scientist. He was a Professor of Computer Sciences at the City College of New York, and the author of over two dozen textbooks on computer programming.
Craig T. Nelson — star of sitcom Coach''
Brian Thompson — known for his work in action films and television series
Allan Byron Swift — Emmy Award-winning broadcaster, served as a member of the United States House of Representatives from 1979 to 1995. He represented the Second Congressional District of Washington as a Democrat.
Wanz — featured singer on Macklemore and Ryan Lewis hit song "Thrift Shop"
Hip Hop Artist Sadistik (Cody Foster) 
Dr. David Boyd — trauma surgeon, and developer of Regional Trauma Emergency Medical Services (EMS).
Susan Elaine Rancourt American murder victim. Rancourt's name was given to university's Barto Hall residence hall.

References

Central Washington University